Sohane Benziane (1984 – October 4, 2002) was a French girl of Algerian ancestry who was killed at the age of 17.

On October 4, 2002 in Vitry-sur-Seine, Val-de-Marne, Île-de-France, 17-year-old Sohane Benziane was burned alive in front of her friends in a cellar by her former boyfriend, a local caid (gang leader). While a watch was kept outside, the killer, nicknamed Nono, who had bought the bottle of gasoline a day before, poured gasoline over Sohane and set her on fire with a lighter.

As Sohane, engulfed in flames, managed to run out screaming in agony, her death was witnessed by a dozen other students that were coming out of class.

The incident captured the attention of the French and international press and sparked outrage throughout France. It led to the founding of the feminist rights movement Ni Putes Ni Soumises.

Despite trial testimony that Sohane's death was intended by the accused, a local Maghrebi gang leader, Jamal Derrar, was convicted of torture and barbarity leading to unintentional death. A second defendant, Tony Rocca, was sentenced to eight years for barring the door of the depot as Sohane screamed for help.

A commemorative plaque in her memory was later desecrated. On 4 October 2005 a platform was inaugurated in her memory, in the presence of her sister Kahina Benziane.

See also 

Ni Putes Ni Soumises
Samira Bellil

Additional sources 
Liberation article on Sohane in French
L'humanite: Article on Sohane in her sister's words in French
Time Europe: Acting on the outrage
Time Magazine: Sisters In Hell
CNN Transcript: Muslim Women Rebel In France
Book review: Review of Ni Putes ni Soumises (Neither Whores nor Submissive) by Fadela Amara, which discusses the case
Vanity Fair: Daughters of France, Daughters of Allah
Newsweek: Sexism in the cites
BBC News: French man jailed in torture case

2002 crimes in France
2002 deaths
2000s in Île-de-France
2000s trials
Crime in Île-de-France
French Muslims
French people of Algerian descent
French victims of crime
October 2002 crimes
October 2002 events in France
Trials in France
Val-de-Marne
Violence against women in France
1984 births